The following is a list of the MuchMusic Video Awards winners for Best International Video By A Canadian. Avril Lavigne holds the record for the most wins with four awards. Alanis Morissette follows her with two wins.

MuchMusic Video Awards